ASV may refer to:

 Adaptive servo-ventilation, a treatment for sleep apnea
 Air-to-Surface Vessel radar (also "anti-surface vessel"), aircraft-mounted radars used to find ships and submarines
 American Society for Virology
 American Standard Version, a translation of the Bible released in 1901
 Amplicon sequence variant, a term used to refer to individual DNA sequences recovered from a high-throughput marker gene analysis
 Anodic stripping voltammetry, a voltammetric method for quantitative determination of specific ionic species
 Armeesportvereinigung Vorwärts, a former East Germany military sports club 
 M1117 Armored Security Vehicle, an armored fighting vehicle produced by Textron
 Asociación de Scouts de Venezuela, the Scouts Association of Venezuela
 Astronomical Society of Victoria, Australia
 ASV Records, a UK record label
 Autonomous Surface Vehicle
 Vatican Secret Archives (Archivum Secretum Vaticanum)